Charlemagne or Charles the Great (Frankish: Karl; 2 April 747 – 28 January 814), a member of the Carolingian dynasty, was King of the Franks from 768, King of the Lombards from 774, and the Emperor of the Romans from 800. Charlemagne succeeded in uniting the majority of western and central Europe and was the first recognized emperor to rule from western Europe after the fall of the Western Roman Empire around three centuries earlier. The expanded Frankish state that Charlemagne founded was the Carolingian Empire, which is considered the first phase in the history of the Holy Roman Empire. He was canonized by Antipope Paschal III—an act later treated as invalid—and he is now regarded by some as beatified (which is a step on the path to sainthood) in the Catholic Church.

Charlemagne was the eldest son of Pepin the Short and Bertrada of Laon. He was born before their canonical marriage. He became king of the Franks in 768 following his father's death, and was initially co-ruler with his brother Carloman I until the latter's death in 771. As sole ruler, he continued his father's policy towards protection of the papacy and became its sole defender, removing the Lombards from power in northern Italy and leading an incursion into Muslim Spain. He also campaigned against the Saxons to his east, Christianizing them (upon penalty of death) which led to events such as the Massacre of Verden. He reached the height of his power in 800 when he was crowned Emperor of the Romans by Pope Leo III on Christmas Day at Old St. Peter's Basilica in Rome.

Charlemagne has been called the "Father of Europe" (Pater Europae), as he united most of Western Europe for the first time since the classical era of the Roman Empire, as well as uniting parts of Europe that had never been under Frankish or Roman rule. His reign spurred the Carolingian Renaissance, a period of energetic cultural and intellectual activity within the Western Church. The Eastern Orthodox Church viewed Charlemagne less favourably, due to his support of the filioque and the Pope's preference of him as emperor over the Byzantine Empire's first female monarch, Irene of Athens. These and other disputes led to the eventual split of Rome and Constantinople in the Great Schism of 1054.

Charlemagne died in 814 after contracting an infectious lung disease. He was laid to rest in the Aachen Cathedral, in his imperial capital city of Aachen. He married at least four times, and three of his legitimate sons lived to adulthood. Only the youngest of them, Louis the Pious, survived to succeed him. Charlemagne is a direct ancestor of many of Europe's royal houses, including the Capetian dynasty, the Ottonian dynasty, the House of Luxembourg, the House of Ivrea and the House of Habsburg.

Names and nicknames 
The name Charlemagne, by which the emperor is normally known in English, comes from the French Charles-le-magne, meaning "Charles the Great". In modern German, Karl der Große has the same meaning. His given name in his native Frankish dialect was Karl ("Charles", Latin: Carolus; Old High German: Karlus; Gallo-Romance: Karlo). He was named after his grandfather, Charles Martel, a choice which intentionally marked him as Martel's true heir.

The nickname magnus (great) may have been associated with him already in his lifetime, but this is not certain. The contemporary Latin Royal Frankish Annals routinely call him Carolus magnus rex, "Charles the great king". As a nickname, it is only certainly attested in the works of the Poeta Saxo around 900 and it only became standard in all the lands of his former empire around 1000.

Charles' achievements gave a new meaning to his name. In many languages of Europe, the very word for "king" derives from his name; e.g., . This development parallels that of the name of the Caesars in the original Roman Empire, which became kaiser and tsar (or czar), among others.

Political background

By the 6th century, the western Germanic tribe of the Franks had been Christianised, due in considerable measure to the Catholic conversion of Clovis I. Francia, ruled by the Merovingians, was the most powerful of the kingdoms that succeeded the Western Roman Empire. Following the Battle of Tertry, the Merovingians declined into powerlessness, for which they have been dubbed the rois fainéants ("do-nothing kings"). Almost all government powers were exercised by their chief officer, the mayor of the palace.

In 687, Pepin of Herstal, mayor of the palace of Austrasia, ended the strife between various kings and their mayors with his victory at Tertry. He became the sole governor of the entire Frankish kingdom. Pepin was the grandson of two important figures of the Austrasian Kingdom: Saint Arnulf of Metz and Pepin of Landen. Pepin of Herstal was eventually succeeded by his son Charles, later known as Charles Martel (Charles the Hammer).

After 737, Charles governed the Franks in lieu of a king and declined to call himself king. Charles was succeeded in 741 by his sons Carloman and Pepin the Short, the father of Charlemagne. In 743, the brothers placed Childeric III on the throne to curb separatism in the periphery. He was the last Merovingian king. Carloman resigned office in 746, preferring to enter the church as a monk. Pepin brought the question of the kingship before Pope Zachary, asking whether it was logical for a king to have no royal power. The pope handed down his decision in 749, decreeing that it was better for Pepin to be called king, as he had the powers of high office as Mayor, so as not to confuse the hierarchy. He, therefore, ordered him to become the true king.

In 750, Pepin was elected by an assembly of the Franks, anointed by the archbishop, and then raised to the office of king. The Pope branded Childeric III as "the false king" and ordered him into a monastery. The Merovingian dynasty was thereby replaced by the Carolingian dynasty, named after Charles Martel. In 753, Pope Stephen II fled from Italy to Francia, appealing to Pepin for assistance for the rights of St. Peter. He was supported in this appeal by Carloman, Charles' brother. In return, the pope could provide only legitimacy. He did this by again anointing and confirming Pepin, this time adding his young sons Carolus (Charlemagne) and Carloman to the royal patrimony. They thereby became heirs to the realm that already covered most of western Europe. In 754, Pepin accepted the Pope's invitation to visit Italy on behalf of St. Peter's rights, dealing successfully with the Lombards.

Under the Carolingians, the Frankish kingdom spread to encompass an area including most of Western Europe; the later east–west division of the kingdom formed the basis for modern France and Germany. Orman portrays the Treaty of Verdun (843) between the warring grandsons of Charlemagne as the foundation event of an independent France under its first king Charles the Bald; an independent Germany under its first king Louis the German; and an independent intermediate state stretching from the Low Countries along the borderlands to south of Rome under Lothair I, who retained the title of emperor and the capitals Aachen and Rome without the jurisdiction. The middle kingdom had broken up by 890 and partly absorbed into the Western kingdom (later France) and the Eastern kingdom (Germany) and the rest developing into smaller "buffer" states that exist between France and Germany to this day, namely Benelux and Switzerland.

Rise to power

Early life 

The most likely date of Charlemagne's birth is reconstructed from several sources. The date of 742—calculated from Einhard's date of death of January 814 at age 72—predates the marriage of his parents in 744. The year given in the Annales Petaviani, 747, would be more likely, except that it contradicts Einhard and a few other sources in making Charlemagne sixty-seven years old at his death. The month and day of 2 April are based on a calendar from Lorsch Abbey. Charlemagne claimed descent from the Roman emperor, Constantine I.

In 747, Easter fell on 2 April, a coincidence that likely would have been remarked upon by chroniclers but was not. If Easter was being used as the beginning of the calendar year, then 2 April 747 could have been, by modern reckoning, April 748 (not on Easter). The date favoured by the preponderance of evidence is 2 April 742, based on Charlemagne's age at the time of his death. This date supports the concept that Charlemagne was technically an illegitimate child, although that is not mentioned by Einhard in either since he was born out of wedlock; Pepin and Bertrada were bound by a private contract or Friedelehe at the time of his birth, but did not marry until 744.

Charlemagne's exact birthplace is unknown, although historians have suggested Aachen in modern-day Germany, and Liège (Herstal) in present-day Belgium as possible locations. Aachen and Liège are close to the region whence the Merovingian and Carolingian families originated. Other cities have been suggested, including Düren, Gauting, Mürlenbach, Quierzy, and Prüm. No definitive evidence resolves the question.

Ancestry 

Charlemagne was the eldest child of Pepin the Short (714 – 24 September 768, reigned from 751) and his wife Bertrada of Laon (720 – 12 July 783), daughter of Caribert of Laon. Many historians consider Charlemagne (Charles) to have been illegitimate, although some state that this is arguable, because Pepin did not marry Bertrada until 744, which was after Charles' birth; this status did not exclude him from the succession.

Records name only Carloman, Gisela, and three short-lived children named Pepin, Chrothais and Adelais as his younger siblings.

Ambiguous high office

The most powerful officers of the Frankish people, the Mayor of the Palace (Maior Domus) and one or more kings (rex, reges), were appointed by the election of the people. Elections were not periodic, but were held as required to elect officers ad quos summa imperii pertinebat, "to whom the highest matters of state pertained". Evidently, interim decisions could be made by the Pope, which ultimately needed to be ratified using an assembly of the people that met annually.

Before he was elected king in 751, Pepin was initially a mayor, a high office he held "as though hereditary" (velut hereditario fungebatur). Einhard explains that "the honour" was usually "given by the people" to the distinguished, but Pepin the Great and his brother Carloman the Wise received it as though hereditary, as had their father, Charles Martel. There was, however, a certain ambiguity about quasi-inheritance. The office was treated as joint property: one Mayorship held by two brothers jointly. Each, however, had his own geographic jurisdiction. When Carloman decided to resign, becoming ultimately a Benedictine at Monte Cassino, the question of the disposition of his quasi-share was settled by the pope. He converted the mayorship into a kingship and awarded the joint property to Pepin, who gained the right to pass it on by inheritance.

This decision was not accepted by all family members. Carloman had consented to the temporary tenancy of his own share, which he intended to pass on to his son, Drogo, when the inheritance should be settled at someone's death. By the Pope's decision, in which Pepin had a hand, Drogo was to be disqualified as an heir in favour of his cousin Charles. He took up arms in opposition to the decision and was joined by Grifo, a half-brother of Pepin and Carloman, who had been given a share by Charles Martel, but was stripped of it and held under loose arrest by his half-brothers after an attempt to seize their shares by military action. Grifo perished in combat in the Battle of Saint-Jean-de-Maurienne while Drogo was hunted down and taken into custody.

According to the Life, Pepin died in Paris on 24 September 768, whereupon the kingship passed jointly to his sons, "with divine assent" (divino nutu).  The Franks "in general assembly" (generali conventu) gave them both the rank of a king (reges) but "partitioned the whole body of the kingdom equally" (totum regni corpus ex aequo partirentur). The annals tell a slightly different version, with the king dying at St-Denis, near Paris. The two "lords" (domni) were "elevated to kingship" (elevati sunt in regnum), Charles on 9 October in Noyon, Carloman on an unspecified date in Soissons. If born in 742, Charles was 26 years old, but he had been campaigning at his father's right hand for several years, which may help to account for his military skill. Carloman was 17.

The language, in either case, suggests that there were not two inheritances, which would have created distinct kings ruling over distinct kingdoms, but a single joint inheritance and a joint kingship tenanted by two equal kings, Charles and his brother Carloman. As before, distinct jurisdictions were awarded. Charles received Pepin's original share as Mayor: the outer parts of the kingdom bordering on the sea, namely Neustria, western Aquitaine, and the northern parts of Austrasia; while Carloman was awarded his uncle's former share, the inner parts: southern Austrasia, Septimania, eastern Aquitaine, Burgundy, Provence, and Swabia, lands bordering Italy. The question of whether these jurisdictions were joint shares reverting to the other brother if one brother died or were inherited property passed on to the descendants of the brother who died was never definitely settled. It came up repeatedly over the succeeding decades until the grandsons of Charlemagne created distinct sovereign kingdoms.

Aquitainian rebellion

Formation of a new Aquitaine

In southern Gaul, Aquitaine had been Romanised and people spoke a Romance language. Similarly, Hispania had been populated by peoples who spoke various languages, including Celtic, but these had now been mostly replaced by Romance languages. Between Aquitaine and Hispania were the Euskaldunak, Latinised to Vascones, or Basques, whose country, Vasconia, extended, according to the distributions of place names attributable to the Basques, mainly in the western Pyrenees but also as far south as the upper river Ebro in Spain and as far north as the river Garonne in France. The French name Gascony derives from Vasconia. The Romans were never able to subjugate the whole of Vasconia. The soldiers they recruited for the Roman legions from those parts they did submit and where they founded the region's first cities were valued for their fighting abilities. The border with Aquitaine was at Toulouse.

In about 660, the Duchy of Vasconia united with the Duchy of Aquitaine to form a single realm under Felix of Aquitaine, ruling from Toulouse. This was a joint kingship with a Basque Duke, Lupus I. Lupus is the Latin translation of Basque Otsoa, "wolf". At Felix's death in 670 the joint property of the kingship reverted entirely to Lupus. As the Basques had no law of joint inheritance but relied on primogeniture, Lupus in effect founded a hereditary dynasty of Basque rulers of an expanded Aquitaine.

Acquisition of Aquitaine by the Carolingians

The Latin chronicles of the end of Visigothic Hispania omit many details, such as identification of characters, filling in the gaps and reconciliation of numerous contradictions. Muslim sources, however, present a more coherent view, such as in the Ta'rikh iftitah al-Andalus ("History of the Conquest of al-Andalus") by Ibn al-Qūṭiyya ("the son of the Gothic woman", referring to the granddaughter of Wittiza, the last Visigothic king of a united Hispania, who married a Moor). Ibn al-Qūṭiyya, who had another, much longer name, must have been relying to some degree on family oral tradition.

According to Ibn al-Qūṭiyya Wittiza, the last Visigothic king of a united Hispania, died before his three sons, Almund, Romulo, and Ardabast reached maturity. Their mother was queen regent at Toledo, but Roderic, army chief of staff, staged a rebellion, capturing Córdoba. He chose to impose a joint rule over distinct jurisdictions on the true heirs. Evidence of a division of some sort can be found in the distribution of coins imprinted with the name of each king and in the king lists. Wittiza was succeeded by Roderic, who reigned for seven and a half years, followed by Achila (Aquila), who reigned three and a half years. If the reigns of both terminated with the incursion of the Saracens, then Roderic appears to have reigned a few years before the majority of Achila. The latter's kingdom was securely placed to the northeast, while Roderic seems to have taken the rest, notably modern Portugal.

The Saracens crossed the mountains to claim Ardo's Septimania, only to encounter the Basque dynasty of Aquitaine, always the allies of the Goths. Odo the Great of Aquitaine was at first victorious at the Battle of Toulouse in 721. Saracen troops gradually massed in Septimania and, in 732, an army under Emir Abdul Rahman Al Ghafiqi advanced into Vasconia, and Odo was defeated at the Battle of the River Garonne. They took Bordeaux and were advancing towards Tours when Odo, powerless to stop them, appealed to his arch-enemy, Charles Martel, mayor of the Franks. In one of the first of the lightning marches for which the Carolingian kings became famous, Charles and his army appeared in the path of the Saracens between Tours and Poitiers, and in the Battle of Tours decisively defeated and killed al-Ghafiqi. The Moors returned twice more, each time suffering defeat at Charles' hands—at the River Berre near Narbonne in 737 and in the Dauphiné in 740. Odo's price for salvation from the Saracens was incorporation into the Frankish kingdom, a decision that was repugnant to him and also to his heirs.

Loss and recovery of Aquitaine
After the death of his father, Hunald I allied himself with free Lombardy. However, Odo had ambiguously left the kingdom jointly to his two sons, Hunald and Hatto. The latter, loyal to Francia, now went to war with his brother over full possession. Victorious, Hunald blinded and imprisoned his brother, only to be so stricken by conscience that he resigned and entered the church as a monk to do penance. The story is told in Annales Mettenses priores. His son Waifer took an early inheritance, becoming duke of Aquitaine and ratifying the alliance with Lombardy. Waifer, deciding to honour it, repeated his father's decision, which he justified by arguing that any agreements with Charles Martel became invalid on Martel's death. Since Aquitaine was now Pepin's inheritance because of the earlier assistance given by Charles Martel, according to some, the latter and his son, the young Charles, hunted down Waifer, who could only conduct a guerrilla war, and executed him.

Among the contingents of the Frankish army were Bavarians under Tassilo III, Duke of Bavaria, an Agilofing, the hereditary Bavarian ducal family. Grifo had installed himself as Duke of Bavaria, but Pepin replaced him with a member of the ducal family yet a child, Tassilo, whose protector he had become after the death of his father. The loyalty of the Agilolfings was perpetually in question, but Pepin exacted numerous oaths of loyalty from Tassilo. However, the latter had married Liutperga, a daughter of Desiderius, king of Lombardy. At a critical point in the campaign, Tassilo left the field with all his Bavarians. Out of reach of Pepin, he repudiated all loyalty to Francia. Pepin had no chance to respond as he grew ill and died within a few weeks after Waifer's execution.

The first event of the brothers' reign was the uprising of the Aquitainians and Gascons in 769, in that territory split between the two kings. One year earlier, Pepin had finally defeated Waifer, Duke of Aquitaine, after waging a destructive, ten-year war against Aquitaine. Now, Hunald II led the Aquitainians as far north as Angoulême. Charles met Carloman, but Carloman refused to participate and returned to Burgundy. Charles went to war, leading an army to Bordeaux, where he built a fortified camp on the mound at Fronsac. Hunald was forced to flee to the court of Duke Lupus II of Gascony. Lupus, fearing Charles, turned Hunald over in exchange for peace, and Hunald was put in a monastery. Gascon lords also surrendered, and Aquitaine and Gascony were finally fully subdued by the Franks.

Marriage to Desiderata
The brothers maintained lukewarm relations with the assistance of their mother Bertrada, but in 770 Charles signed a treaty with Duke Tassilo III of Bavaria and married a Lombard Princess (commonly known today as Desiderata), the daughter of King Desiderius, to surround Carloman with his own allies. Though Pope Stephen III first opposed the marriage with the Lombard princess, he found little to fear from a Frankish-Lombard alliance.

Less than a year after his marriage, Charlemagne repudiated Desiderata and married a 13-year-old Swabian named Hildegard. The repudiated Desiderata returned to her father's court at Pavia. Her father's wrath was now aroused, and he would have gladly allied with Carloman to defeat Charles. Before any open hostilities could be declared, however, Carloman died on 5 December 771, apparently of natural causes. Carloman's widow Gerberga fled to Desiderius' court with her sons for protection.

Wives, concubines, and children 

Charlemagne had eighteen children with seven of his ten known wives or concubines. Nonetheless, he had only four legitimate grandsons, the four sons of his fourth son, Louis. In addition, he had a grandson (Bernard of Italy, the only son of his third son, Pepin of Italy), who was illegitimate but included in the line of inheritance. Among his descendants are several royal dynasties, including the Habsburg, and Capetian dynasties. By consequence, most if not all established European noble families ever since can genealogically trace some of their background to Charlemagne.

Children

During the first peace of any substantial length (780–782), Charles began to appoint his sons to positions of authority. In 781, during a visit to Rome, he made his two youngest sons kings, crowned by the Pope. The elder of these two, Carloman, was made the king of Italy, taking the Iron Crown that his father had first worn in 774, and in the same ceremony was renamed "Pepin" (not to be confused with Charlemagne's eldest, possibly illegitimate son, Pepin the Hunchback). The younger of the two, Louis, became King of Aquitaine. Charlemagne ordered Pepin and Louis to be raised in the customs of their kingdoms, and he gave their regents some control of their subkingdoms, but kept the real power, though he intended his sons to inherit their realms. He did not tolerate insubordination in his sons: in 792, he banished Pepin the Hunchback to Prüm Abbey because the young man had joined a rebellion against him.

Charles was determined to have his children educated, including his daughters, as his parents had instilled the importance of learning in him at an early age. His children were also taught skills in accord with their aristocratic status, which included training in riding and weaponry for his sons, and embroidery, spinning and weaving for his daughters.

The sons fought many wars on behalf of their father. Charles was mostly preoccupied with the Bretons, whose border he shared and who insurrected on at least two occasions and were easily put down. He also fought the Saxons on multiple occasions. In 805 and 806, he was sent into the Böhmerwald (modern Bohemia) to deal with the Slavs living there (Bohemian tribes, ancestors of the modern Czechs). He subjected them to Frankish authority and devastated the valley of the Elbe, forcing tribute from them. Pippin had to hold the Avar and Beneventan borders and fought the Slavs to his north. He was uniquely poised to fight the Byzantine Empire when that conflict arose after Charlemagne's imperial coronation and a Venetian rebellion. Finally, Louis was in charge of the Spanish March and fought the Duke of Benevento in southern Italy on at least one occasion. He took Barcelona in a great siege in 801.

Charlemagne kept his daughters at home with him and refused to allow them to contract sacramental marriages (though he originally condoned an engagement between his eldest daughter Rotrude and Constantine VI of Byzantium, this engagement was annulled when Rotrude was 11). Charlemagne's opposition to his daughters' marriages may possibly have intended to prevent the creation of cadet branches of the family to challenge the main line, as had been the case with Tassilo of Bavaria. However, he tolerated their extramarital relationships, even rewarding their common-law husbands and treasuring the illegitimate grandchildren they produced for him. He also refused to believe stories of their wild behaviour. After his death the surviving daughters were banished from the court by their brother, the pious Louis, to take up residence in the convents they had been bequeathed by their father. At least one of them, Bertha, had a recognised relationship, if not a marriage, with Angilbert, a member of Charlemagne's court circle.

Italian campaigns

Conquest of the Lombard kingdom

At his succession in 772, Pope Adrian I demanded the return of certain cities in the former exarchate of Ravenna in accordance with a promise at the succession of Desiderius. Instead, Desiderius took over certain papal cities and invaded the Pentapolis, heading for Rome. Adrian sent ambassadors to Charlemagne in autumn requesting he enforce the policies of his father, Pepin. Desiderius sent his own ambassadors denying the pope's charges. The ambassadors met at Thionville, and Charlemagne upheld the pope's side. Charlemagne demanded what the pope had requested, but Desiderius swore never to comply. Charlemagne and his uncle Bernard crossed the Alps in 773 and chased the Lombards back to Pavia, which they then besieged. Charlemagne temporarily left the siege to deal with Adelchis, son of Desiderius, who was raising an army at Verona. The young prince was chased to the Adriatic littoral and fled to Constantinople to plead for assistance from Constantine V, who was waging war with Bulgaria.

The siege lasted until the spring of 774 when Charlemagne visited the pope in Rome. There he confirmed his father's grants of land, with some later chronicles falsely claiming that he also expanded them, granting Tuscany, Emilia, Venice and Corsica. The pope granted him the title patrician. He then returned to Pavia, where the Lombards were on the verge of surrendering. In return for their lives, the Lombards surrendered and opened the gates in early summer. Desiderius was sent to the abbey of Corbie, and his son Adelchis died in Constantinople, a patrician. Charles, unusually, had himself crowned with the Iron Crown and made the magnates of Lombardy pay homage to him at Pavia. Only Duke Arechis II of Benevento refused to submit and proclaimed independence. Charlemagne was then master of Italy as king of the Lombards. He left Italy with a garrison in Pavia and a few Frankish counts in place the same year.

Instability continued in Italy. In 776, Dukes Hrodgaud of Friuli and Hildeprand of Spoleto rebelled. Charlemagne rushed back from Saxony and defeated the Duke of Friuli in battle; the Duke was slain. The Duke of Spoleto signed a treaty. Their co-conspirator, Arechis, was not subdued, and Adelchis, their candidate in Byzantium, never left that city. Northern Italy was now faithfully his.

Southern Italy
In 787, Charlemagne directed his attention towards the Duchy of Benevento, where Arechis II was reigning independently with the self-given title of Princeps. Charlemagne's siege of Salerno forced Arechis into submission, and in return for peace, Arechis recognized Charlemagne's suzerainty and handed his son Grimoald III over as a hostage. After Arechis' death in 787, Grimoald was allowed to return to Benevento. In 788, the principality was invaded by Byzantine troops led by Adelchis, but his attempts were thwarted by Grimoald. The Franks assisted in the repulsion of Adelchis, but, in turn, attacked Benevento's territories several times, obtaining small gains, notably the annexation of Chieti to the duchy of Spoleto. Later, Grimoald tried to throw off Frankish suzerainty, but Charles' sons, Pepin of Italy and Charles the Younger, forced him to submit in 792.

Carolingian expansion to the south

Vasconia and the Pyrenees
The destructive war led by Pepin in Aquitaine, although brought to a satisfactory conclusion for the Franks, proved the Frankish power structure south of the Loire was feeble and unreliable. After the defeat and death of Waiofar in 768, while Aquitaine submitted again to the Carolingian dynasty, a new rebellion broke out in 769 led by Hunald II, a possible son of Waifer. He took refuge with the ally Duke Lupus II of Gascony, but probably out of fear of Charlemagne's reprisal, Lupus handed him over to the new King of the Franks to whom he pledged loyalty, which seemed to confirm the peace in the Basque area south of the Garonne. In the campaign of 769, Charlemagne seems to have followed a policy of "overwhelming force" and avoided a major pitched battle

Wary of new Basque uprisings, Charlemagne seems to have tried to contain Duke Lupus's power by appointing Seguin as the Count of Bordeaux (778) and other counts of Frankish background in bordering areas (Toulouse, County of Fézensac). The Basque Duke, in turn, seems to have contributed decisively or schemed the Battle of Roncevaux Pass (referred to as "Basque treachery"). The defeat of Charlemagne's army in Roncevaux (778) confirmed his determination to rule directly by establishing the Kingdom of Aquitaine (ruled by Louis the Pious) based on a power base of Frankish officials, distributing lands among colonisers and allocating lands to the Church, which he took as an ally. A Christianisation programme was put in place across the high Pyrenees (778).

The new political arrangement for Vasconia did not sit well with local lords. As of 788 Adalric was fighting and capturing Chorson, Carolingian Count of Toulouse. He was eventually released, but Charlemagne, enraged at the compromise, decided to depose him and appointed his trustee William of Gellone. William, in turn, fought the Basques and defeated them after banishing Adalric (790).

From 781 (Pallars, Ribagorça) to 806 (Pamplona under Frankish influence), taking the County of Toulouse for a power base, Charlemagne asserted Frankish authority over the Pyrenees by subduing the south-western marches of Toulouse (790) and establishing vassal counties on the southern Pyrenees that were to make up the Marca Hispanica. As of 794, a Frankish vassal, the Basque lord Belasko (al-Galashki, 'the Gaul') ruled Álava, but Pamplona remained under Cordovan and local control up to 806. Belasko and the counties in the Marca Hispánica provided the necessary base to attack the Andalusians (an expedition led by William Count of Toulouse and Louis the Pious to capture Barcelona in 801). Events in the Duchy of Vasconia (rebellion in Pamplona, count overthrown in Aragon, Duke Seguin of Bordeaux deposed, uprising of the Basque lords, etc.) were to prove it ephemeral upon Charlemagne's death.

Roncesvalles campaign

According to the Muslim historian Ibn al-Athir, the Diet of Paderborn had received the representatives of the Muslim rulers of Zaragoza, Girona, Barcelona and Huesca. Their masters had been cornered in the Iberian peninsula by Abd ar-Rahman I, the Umayyad emir of Cordova. These "Saracen" (Moorish and Muwallad) rulers offered their homage to the king of the Franks in return for military support. Seeing an opportunity to extend Christendom and his own power, and believing the Saxons to be a fully conquered nation, Charlemagne agreed to go to Spain.

In 778, he led the Neustrian army across the Western Pyrenees, while the Austrasians, Lombards, and Burgundians passed over the Eastern Pyrenees. The armies met at Saragossa and Charlemagne received the homage of the Muslim rulers, Sulayman al-Arabi and Kasmin ibn Yusuf, but the city did not fall for him. Indeed, Charlemagne faced the toughest battle of his career. The Muslims forced him to retreat, so he decided to go home, as he could not trust the Basques, whom he had subdued by conquering Pamplona. He turned to leave Iberia, but as his army was crossing back through the Pass of Roncesvalles, one of the most famous events of his reign occurred: the Basques attacked and destroyed his rearguard and baggage train. The Battle of Roncevaux Pass, though less a battle than a skirmish, left many famous dead, including the seneschal Eggihard, the count of the palace Anselm, and the warden of the Breton March, Roland, inspiring the subsequent creation of The Song of Roland (La Chanson de Roland), regarded as the first major work in the French language.

Contact with the Saracens

The conquest of Italy brought Charlemagne in contact with the Saracens who, at the time, controlled the Mediterranean. Charlemagne's eldest son, Pepin the Hunchback, was much occupied with Saracens in Italy. Charlemagne conquered Corsica and Sardinia at an unknown date and in 799 the Balearic Islands. The islands were often attacked by Saracen pirates, but the counts of Genoa and Tuscany (Boniface) controlled them with large fleets until the end of Charlemagne's reign. Charlemagne even had contact with the caliphal court in Baghdad. In 797 (or possibly 801), the caliph of Baghdad, Harun al-Rashid, presented Charlemagne with an Asian elephant named Abul-Abbas and a clock.

Wars with the Moors

In Hispania, the struggle against the Moors continued unabated throughout the latter half of his reign. Louis was in charge of the Spanish border. In 785, his men captured Girona permanently and extended Frankish control into the Catalan littoral for the duration of Charlemagne's reign (the area remained nominally Frankish until the Treaty of Corbeil in 1258). The Muslim chiefs in the northeast of Islamic Spain were constantly rebelling against Cordovan authority, and they often turned to the Franks for help. The Frankish border was slowly extended until 795, when Girona, Cardona, Ausona and Urgell were united into the new Spanish March, within the old duchy of Septimania.

In 797, Barcelona, the greatest city of the region, fell to the Franks when Zeid, its governor, rebelled against Cordova and, failing, handed it to them. The Umayyad authority recaptured it in 799. However, Louis of Aquitaine marched the entire army of his kingdom over the Pyrenees and besieged it for two years, wintering there from 800 to 801, when it capitulated. The Franks continued to press forward against the emir. They probably took Tarragona and forced the submission of Tortosa in 809. The last conquest brought them to the mouth of the Ebro and gave them raiding access to Valencia, prompting the Emir al-Hakam I to recognise their conquests in 813.

Eastern campaigns

Saxon Wars

Charlemagne was engaged in almost constant warfare throughout his reign, often at the head of his elite scara bodyguard squadrons. In the Saxon Wars, spanning thirty years and eighteen battles, he conquered Saxonia and proceeded to convert it to Christianity.

The Germanic Saxons were divided into four subgroups in four regions. Nearest to Austrasia was Westphalia and farthest away was Eastphalia. Between them was Engria and north of these three, at the base of the Jutland peninsula, was Nordalbingia.

In his first campaign, in 773, Charlemagne forced the Engrians to submit and cut down an Irminsul pillar near Paderborn. The campaign was cut short by his first expedition to Italy. He returned in 775, marching through Westphalia and conquering the Saxon fort at Sigiburg. He then crossed Engria, where he defeated the Saxons again. Finally, in Eastphalia, he defeated a Saxon force, and its leader Hessi converted to Christianity. Charlemagne returned through Westphalia, leaving encampments at Sigiburg and Eresburg, which had been important Saxon bastions. He then controlled Saxony with the exception of Nordalbingia, but Saxon resistance had not ended.

Following his subjugation of the Dukes of Friuli and Spoleto, Charlemagne returned rapidly to Saxony in 776, where a rebellion had destroyed his fortress at Eresburg. The Saxons were once again defeated, but their main leader, Widukind, escaped to Denmark, his wife's home. Charlemagne built a new camp at Karlstadt. In 777, he called a national diet at Paderborn to integrate Saxony fully into the Frankish kingdom. Many Saxons were baptised as Christians.

In the summer of 779, he again invaded Saxony and reconquered Eastphalia, Engria and Westphalia. At a diet near Lippe, he divided the land into missionary districts and himself assisted in several mass baptisms (780). He then returned to Italy and, for the first time, the Saxons did not immediately revolt. Saxony was peaceful from 780 to 782.

He returned to Saxony in 782 and instituted a code of law and appointed counts, both Saxon and Frank. The laws were draconian on religious issues; for example, the Capitulatio de partibus Saxoniae prescribed death to Saxon pagans who refused to convert to Christianity. This led to renewed conflict. That year, in autumn, Widukind returned and led a new revolt. In response, at Verden in Lower Saxony, Charlemagne is recorded as having ordered the execution of 4,500 Saxon prisoners by beheading, known as the Massacre of Verden ("Verdener Blutgericht"). The killings triggered three years of renewed bloody warfare. During this war, the East Frisians between the Lauwers and the Weser joined the Saxons in revolt and were finally subdued. The war ended with Widukind accepting baptism. The Frisians afterwards asked for missionaries to be sent to them and a bishop of their own nation, Ludger, was sent. Charlemagne also promulgated a law code, the Lex Frisonum, as he did for most subject peoples.

Thereafter, the Saxons maintained the peace for seven years, but in 792 Westphalia again rebelled. The Eastphalians and Nordalbingians joined them in 793, but the insurrection was unpopular and was put down by 794. An Engrian rebellion followed in 796, but the presence of Charlemagne, Christian Saxons and Slavs quickly crushed it. The last insurrection occurred in 804, more than thirty years after Charlemagne's first campaign against them, but also failed. According to Einhard:

Submission of Bavaria

By 774, Charlemagne had invaded the Kingdom of Lombardy, and he later annexed the Lombardian territories and assumed its crown, placing the Papal States under Frankish protection. The Duchy of Spoleto south of Rome was acquired in 774, while in the central western parts of Europe, the Duchy of Bavaria was absorbed and the Bavarian policy continued of establishing tributary marches, (borders protected in return for tribute or taxes) among the Slavic Serbs and Czechs. The remaining power confronting the Franks in the east were the Avars. However, Charlemagne acquired other Slavic areas, including Bohemia, Moravia, Austria and Croatia.

In 789, Charlemagne turned to Bavaria. He claimed that Tassilo III, Duke of Bavaria was an unfit ruler, due to his oath-breaking. The charges were exaggerated, but Tassilo was deposed anyway and put in the monastery of Jumièges. In 794, Tassilo was made to renounce any claim to Bavaria for himself and his family (the Agilolfings) at the synod of Frankfurt; he formally handed over to the king all of the rights he had held. Bavaria was subdivided into Frankish counties, as had been done with Saxony.

Avar campaigns

In 788, the Avars, an Asian nomadic group that had settled down in what is today Hungary (Einhard called them Huns), invaded Friuli and Bavaria. Charlemagne was preoccupied with other matters until 790 when he marched down the Danube and ravaged Avar territory to the Győr. A Lombard army under Pippin then marched into the Drava valley and ravaged Pannonia. The campaigns ended when the Saxons revolted again in 792.

For the next two years, Charlemagne was occupied, along with the Slavs, against the Saxons. Pippin and Duke Eric of Friuli continued, however, to assault the Avars' ring-shaped strongholds. The great Ring of the Avars, their capital fortress, was taken twice. The booty was sent to Charlemagne at his capital, Aachen, and redistributed to his followers and to foreign rulers, including King Offa of Mercia. Soon the Avar tuduns had lost the will to fight and travelled to Aachen to become vassals to Charlemagne and to become Christians. Charlemagne accepted their surrender and sent one native chief, baptised Abraham, back to Avaria with the ancient title of khagan. Abraham kept his people in line, but in 800, the Bulgarians under Khan Krum attacked the remains of the Avar state.

In 803, Charlemagne sent a Bavarian army into Pannonia, defeating and bringing an end to the Avar confederation.

In November of the same year, Charlemagne went to Regensburg where the Avar leaders acknowledged him as their ruler. In 805, the Avar khagan, who had already been baptised, went to Aachen to ask permission to settle with his people south-eastward from Vienna. The Transdanubian territories became integral parts of the Frankish realm, which was abolished by the Magyars in 899–900.

Northeast Slav expeditions
In 789, in recognition of his new pagan neighbours, the Slavs, Charlemagne marched an Austrasian-Saxon army across the Elbe into Obotrite territory. The Slavs ultimately submitted, led by their leader Witzin. Charlemagne then accepted the surrender of the Veleti under Dragovit and demanded many hostages. He also demanded permission to send missionaries into this pagan region unmolested. The army marched to the Baltic before turning around and marching to the Rhine, winning much booty with no harassment. The tributary Slavs became loyal allies. In 795, when the Saxons broke the peace, the Abotrites and Veleti rebelled with their new ruler against the Saxons. Witzin died in battle and Charlemagne avenged him by harrying the Eastphalians on the Elbe. Thrasuco, his successor, led his men to conquest over the Nordalbingians and handed their leaders over to Charlemagne, who honoured him. The Abotrites remained loyal until Charles' death and fought later against the Danes.

Southeast Slav expeditions
When Charlemagne incorporated much of Central Europe, he brought the Frankish state face to face with the Avars and Slavs in the southeast. The most southeast Frankish neighbours were Croats, who settled in Lower Pannonia and Duchy of Croatia. While fighting the Avars, the Franks had called for their support. During the 790s, he won a major victory over them in 796. Duke Vojnomir of Lower Pannonia aided Charlemagne, and the Franks made themselves overlords over the Croats of northern Dalmatia, Slavonia and Pannonia.

The Frankish commander Eric of Friuli wanted to extend his dominion by conquering the Littoral Croat Duchy. During that time, Dalmatian Croatia was ruled by Duke Višeslav of Croatia. In the Battle of Trsat, the forces of Eric fled their positions and were routed by the forces of Višeslav. Eric was among those killed which was a great blow for the Carolingian Empire.

Charlemagne also directed his attention to the Slavs to the west of the Avar khaganate: the Carantanians and Carniolans. These people were subdued by the Lombards and Bavarii and made tributaries, but were never fully incorporated into the Frankish state.

Imperium

Coronation

In 799, Pope Leo III had been assaulted by some of the Romans, who tried to put out his eyes and tear out his tongue. Leo escaped and fled to Charlemagne at Paderborn. Charlemagne, advised by scholar Alcuin, travelled to Rome, in November 800 and held a synod. On 23 December, Leo swore an oath of innocence to Charlemagne. His position having thereby been weakened, the Pope sought to restore his status. Two days later, at Mass, on Christmas Day (25 December), when Charlemagne knelt at the altar to pray, the Pope crowned him Imperator Romanorum ("Emperor of the Romans") in Saint Peter's Basilica. In so doing, the Pope rejected the legitimacy of Empress Irene of Constantinople:

Charlemagne's coronation as Emperor, though intended to represent the continuation of the unbroken line of Emperors from Augustus to Constantine VI, had the effect of setting up two separate (and often opposing) Empires and two separate claims to imperial authority. It led to war in 802, and for centuries to come, the Emperors of both West and East would make competing claims of sovereignty over the whole.

Einhard says that Charlemagne was ignorant of the Pope's intent and did not want any such coronation:

A number of modern scholars, however, suggest that Charlemagne was indeed aware of the coronation; certainly, he cannot have missed the bejewelled crown waiting on the altar when he came to pray—something even contemporary sources support.

Debate 

Historians have debated for centuries whether Charlemagne was aware before the coronation of the Pope's intention to crown him Emperor (Charlemagne declared that he would not have entered Saint Peter's had he known, according to chapter twenty-eight of Einhard's Vita Karoli Magni), but that debate obscured the more significant question of why the Pope granted the title and why Charlemagne accepted it.

Collins points out "[t]hat the motivation behind the acceptance of the imperial title was a romantic and antiquarian interest in reviving the Roman Empire is highly unlikely." For one thing, such romance would not have appealed either to Franks or Roman Catholics at the turn of the ninth century, both of whom viewed the Classical heritage of the Roman Empire with distrust. The Franks took pride in having "fought against and thrown from their shoulders the heavy yoke of the Romans" and "from the knowledge gained in baptism, clothed in gold and precious stones the bodies of the holy martyrs whom the Romans had killed by fire, by the sword and by wild animals", as Pepin III described it in a law of 763 or 764.

Furthermore, the new title—carrying with it the risk that the new emperor would "make drastic changes to the traditional styles and procedures of government" or "concentrate his attentions on Italy or on Mediterranean concerns more generally"—risked alienating the Frankish leadership.

For both the Pope and Charlemagne, the Roman Empire remained a significant power in European politics at this time. The Byzantine Empire, based in Constantinople, continued to hold a substantial portion of Italy, with borders not far south of Rome. Charles' sitting in judgment of the Pope could be seen as usurping the prerogatives of the Emperor in Constantinople:

For the Pope, then, there was "no living Emperor at that time" though Henri Pirenne disputes this saying that the coronation "was not in any sense explained by the fact that at this moment a woman was reigning in Constantinople". Nonetheless, the Pope took the extraordinary step of creating one. The papacy had since 727 been in conflict with Irene's predecessors in Constantinople over a number of issues, chiefly the continued Byzantine adherence to the doctrine of iconoclasm, the destruction of Christian images; while from 750, the secular power of the Byzantine Empire in central Italy had been nullified.

By bestowing the Imperial crown upon Charlemagne, the Pope arrogated to himself "the right to appoint ... the Emperor of the Romans, ... establishing the imperial crown as his own personal gift but simultaneously granting himself implicit superiority over the Emperor whom he had created." And "because the Byzantines had proved so unsatisfactory from every point of view—political, military and doctrinal—he would select a westerner: the one man who by his wisdom and statesmanship and the vastness of his dominions ... stood out head and shoulders above his contemporaries."

With Charlemagne's coronation, therefore, "the Roman Empire remained, so far as either of them [Charlemagne and Leo] were concerned, one and indivisible, with Charles as its Emperor", though there can have been "little doubt that the coronation, with all that it implied, would be furiously contested in Constantinople".

Alcuin writes hopefully in his letters of an Imperium Christianum ("Christian Empire"), wherein, "just as the inhabitants of the [Roman Empire] had been united by a common Roman citizenship", presumably this new empire would be united by a common Christian faith. This is the view of Pirenne when he says "Charles was the Emperor of the ecclesia as the Pope conceived it, of the Roman Church, regarded as the universal Church". The Imperium Christianum was further supported at a number of synods all across Europe by Paulinus of Aquileia.

What is known, from the Byzantine chronicler Theophanes, is that Charlemagne's reaction to his coronation was to take the initial steps towards securing the Constantinopolitan throne by sending envoys of marriage to Irene, and that Irene reacted somewhat favourably to them.

Distinctions between the universalist and localist conceptions of the empire remain controversial among historians. According to the former, the empire was a universal monarchy, a "commonwealth of the whole world, whose sublime unity transcended every minor distinction"; and the emperor "was entitled to the obedience of Christendom". According to the latter, the emperor had no ambition for universal dominion; his realm was limited in the same way as that of every other ruler, and when he made more far-reaching claims his object was normally to ward off the attacks either of the Pope or of the Byzantine emperor. According to this view, also, the origin of the empire is to be explained by specific local circumstances rather than by overarching theories.

According to Ohnsorge, for a long time, it had been the custom of Byzantium to designate the German princes as spiritual "sons" of the Romans. What might have been acceptable in the fifth century had become provoking and insulting to the Franks in the eighth century. Charles came to believe that the Roman emperor, who claimed to head the world hierarchy of states, was, in reality, no greater than Charles himself, a king as other kings, since beginning in 629 he had entitled himself "Basileus" (translated literally as "king"). Ohnsorge finds it significant that the chief wax seal of Charles, which bore only the inscription: "Christe, protege Carolum regem Francorum" [Christ, protect Charles, king of the Franks], was used from 772 to 813, even during the imperial period and was not replaced by a special imperial seal; indicating that Charles felt himself to be just the king of the Franks. Finally, Ohnsorge points out that in the spring of 813 at Aachen Charles crowned his only surviving son, Louis, as the emperor without recourse to Rome with only the acclamation of his Franks. The form in which this acclamation was offered was Frankish-Christian rather than Roman. This implies both independence from Rome and a Frankish (non-Roman) understanding of empire.

Mayr-Harting argues that the Imperial title was Charlemagne's face-saving offer to incorporate the recently conquered Saxons. Since the Saxons did not have an institution of kingship for their own ethnicity, claiming the right to rule them as King of the Saxons was not possible. Hence, it is argued, Charlemagne used the supra-ethnic Imperial title to incorporate the Saxons, which helped to cement the diverse peoples under his rule.

Imperial title
Charlemagne used these circumstances to claim that he was the "renewer of the Roman Empire", which had declined under the Byzantines. In his official charters, Charles preferred the style Karolus serenissimus Augustus a Deo coronatus magnus pacificus imperator Romanum gubernans imperium ("Charles, most serene Augustus crowned by God, the great, peaceful emperor ruling the Roman empire") to the more direct Imperator Romanorum ("Emperor of the Romans").

The title of Emperor remained in the Carolingian family for years to come, but divisions of territory and in-fighting over supremacy of the Frankish state weakened its significance. The papacy itself never forgot the title nor abandoned the right to bestow it. When the family of Charles ceased to produce worthy heirs, the Pope gladly crowned whichever Italian magnate could best protect him from his local enemies. The empire would remain in continuous existence for over a millennium, as the Holy Roman Empire, a true imperial successor to Charles.

Imperial diplomacy

The iconoclasm of the Byzantine Isaurian Dynasty was endorsed by the Franks. The Second Council of Nicaea reintroduced the veneration of icons under Empress Irene. The council was not recognised by Charlemagne since no Frankish emissaries had been invited, even though Charlemagne ruled more than three provinces of the classical Roman empire and was considered equal in rank to the Byzantine emperor. And while the Pope supported the reintroduction of the iconic veneration, he politically digressed from Byzantium. He certainly desired to increase the influence of the papacy, to honour his saviour Charlemagne, and to solve the constitutional issues then most troubling to European jurists in an era when Rome was not in the hands of an emperor. Thus, Charlemagne's assumption of the imperial title was not a usurpation in the eyes of the Franks or Italians. It was, however, seen as such in Byzantium, where it was protested by Irene and her successor Nikephoros I—neither of whom had any great effect in enforcing their protests.

The East Romans, however, still held several territories in Italy: Venice (what was left of the Exarchate of Ravenna), Reggio (in Calabria), Otranto (in Apulia), and Naples (the Ducatus Neapolitanus). These regions remained outside of Frankish hands until 804, when the Venetians, torn by infighting, transferred their allegiance to the Iron Crown of Pippin, Charles' son. The Pax Nicephori ended. Nicephorus ravaged the coasts with a fleet, initiating the only instance of war between the Byzantines and the Franks. The conflict lasted until 810 when the pro-Byzantine party in Venice gave their city back to the Byzantine Emperor, and the two emperors of Europe made peace: Charlemagne received the Istrian peninsula and in 812 the emperor Michael I Rangabe recognised his status as Emperor, although not necessarily as "Emperor of the Romans".

Danish attacks
After the conquest of Nordalbingia, the Frankish frontier was brought into contact with Scandinavia. The pagan Danes, "a race almost unknown to his ancestors, but destined to be only too well known to his sons" as Charles Oman described them, inhabiting the Jutland peninsula, had heard many stories from Widukind and his allies who had taken refuge with them about the dangers of the Franks and the fury which their Christian king could direct against pagan neighbours.

In 808, the king of the Danes, Godfred, expanded the vast Danevirke across the isthmus of Schleswig. The Danevirke protected Danish land and gave Godfred the opportunity to harass Frisia and Flanders with pirate raids. He also subdued the Frank-allied Veleti and fought the Abotrites.

Godfred invaded Frisia, joked of visiting Aachen, but was murdered before he could do any more, either by a Frankish assassin or by one of his own men. Godfred was succeeded by his nephew Hemming, who concluded the Treaty of Heiligen with Charlemagne in late 811.

Death

In 813, Charlemagne called Louis the Pious, king of Aquitaine, his only surviving legitimate son, to his court. There Charlemagne crowned his son as co-emperor and sent him back to Aquitaine. He then spent the autumn hunting before returning to Aachen on 1 November. In January, he fell ill with pleurisy. In deep depression (mostly because many of his plans were not yet realised), he took to his bed on 21 January and as Einhard tells it:

He was buried that same day, in Aachen Cathedral. The earliest surviving planctus, the Planctus de obitu Karoli, was composed by a monk of Bobbio, which he had patronised. A later story, told by Otho of Lomello, Count of the Palace at Aachen in the time of Emperor Otto III, would claim that he and Otto had discovered Charlemagne's tomb: Charlemagne, they claimed, was seated upon a throne, wearing a crown and holding a sceptre, his flesh almost entirely incorrupt. In 1165, Emperor Frederick I re-opened the tomb again and placed the emperor in a sarcophagus beneath the floor of the cathedral. In 1215 Emperor Frederick II re-interred him in a casket made of gold and silver known as the Karlsschrein.

Charlemagne's death emotionally affected many of his subjects, particularly those of the literary clique who had surrounded him at Aachen. An anonymous monk of Bobbio lamented:

Louis succeeded him as Charles had intended. He left a testament allocating his assets in 811 that was not updated prior to his death. He left most of his wealth to the Church, to be used for charity. His empire lasted only another generation in its entirety; its division, according to custom, between Louis's own sons after their father's death laid the foundation for the modern states of Germany and France.

Administration

Organisation
The Carolingian king exercised the bannum, the right to rule and command. Under the Franks, it was a royal prerogative but could be delegated. He had supreme jurisdiction in judicial matters, made legislation, led the army, and protected both the Church and the poor. His administration was an attempt to organise the kingdom, church and nobility around him. As an administrator, Charlemagne stands out for his many reforms: monetary, governmental, military, cultural and ecclesiastical. He is the main protagonist of the "Carolingian Renaissance".

Military
Charlemagne's success rested primarily on novel siege technologies and excellent logistics rather than the long-claimed "cavalry revolution" led by Charles Martel in 730s. However, the stirrup, which made the "shock cavalry" lance charge possible, was not introduced to the Frankish kingdom until the late eighth century.

Horses were used extensively by the Frankish military because they provided a quick, long-distance method of transporting troops, which was critical to building and maintaining the large empire.

Economic and monetary reforms

Charlemagne had an important role in determining Europe's immediate economic future. Pursuing his father's reforms, Charlemagne abolished the monetary system based on the gold . Instead, he and the Anglo-Saxon King Offa of Mercia took up Pippin's system for pragmatic reasons, notably a shortage of the metal.

The gold shortage was a direct consequence of the conclusion of peace with Byzantium, which resulted in ceding Venice and Sicily to the East and losing their trade routes to Africa. The resulting standardisation economically harmonised and unified the complex array of currencies that had been in use at the commencement of his reign, thus simplifying trade and commerce.

Charlemagne instituted principles for accounting practice by means of the Capitulare de villis of 802, which laid down strict rules for the way in which incomes and expenses were to be recorded.

Charlemagne applied this system to much of the European continent, and Offa's standard was voluntarily adopted by much of England. After Charlemagne's death, continental coinage degraded, and most of Europe resorted to using the continued high-quality English coin until about 1100.

Jews in Charlemagne's realm
Early in Charlemagne's rule he tacitly allowed Jews to monopolise money lending. He invited Italian Jews to immigrate, as royal clients independent of the feudal landowners, and form trading communities in the agricultural regions of Provence and the Rhineland. Their trading activities augmented the otherwise almost exclusively agricultural economies of these regions. His personal physician was Jewish, and he employed a Jew named Isaac as his personal representative to the Muslim caliphate of Baghdad.

Education reforms

Part of Charlemagne's success as a warrior, an administrator and ruler can be traced to his admiration for learning and education. His reign is often referred to as the Carolingian Renaissance because of the flowering of scholarship, literature, art and architecture that characterise it. Charlemagne came into contact with the culture and learning of other countries (especially Moorish Spain, Anglo-Saxon England, and Lombard Italy) due to his vast conquests. He greatly increased the provision of monastic schools and scriptoria (centres for book-copying) in Francia.

Charlemagne was a lover of books, sometimes having them read to him during meals. He was thought to enjoy the works of Augustine of Hippo. His court played a key role in producing books that taught elementary Latin and different aspects of the church. It also played a part in creating a royal library that contained in-depth works on language and Christian faith.

Charlemagne encouraged clerics to translate Christian creeds and prayers into their respective vernaculars as well to teach grammar and music. Due to the increased interest of intellectual pursuits and the urging of their king, the monks accomplished so much copying that almost every manuscript from that time was preserved. At the same time, at the urging of their king, scholars were producing more secular books on many subjects, including history, poetry, art, music, law, theology, etc. Due to the increased number of titles, private libraries flourished. These were mainly supported by aristocrats and churchmen who could afford to sustain them. At Charlemagne's court, a library was founded and a number of copies of books were produced, to be distributed by Charlemagne. Book production was completed slowly by hand and took place mainly in large monastic libraries. Books were so in demand during Charlemagne's time that these libraries lent out some books, but only if that borrower offered valuable collateral in return.

Most of the surviving works of classical Latin were copied and preserved by Carolingian scholars. Indeed, the earliest manuscripts available for many ancient texts are Carolingian. It is almost certain that a text which survived to the Carolingian age survives still.

The pan-European nature of Charlemagne's influence is indicated by the origins of many of the men who worked for him: Alcuin, an Anglo-Saxon from York; Theodulf, a Visigoth, probably from Septimania; Paul the Deacon, Lombard; Italians Peter of Pisa and Paulinus of Aquileia; and Franks Angilbert, Angilram, Einhard and Waldo of Reichenau.

Charlemagne promoted the liberal arts at court, ordering that his children and grandchildren be well-educated, and even studying himself (in a time when even leaders who promoted education did not take time to learn themselves) under the tutelage of Peter of Pisa, from whom he learned grammar; Alcuin, with whom he studied rhetoric, dialectic (logic), and astronomy (he was particularly interested in the movements of the stars); and Einhard, who tutored him in arithmetic.

His great scholarly failure, as Einhard relates, was his inability to write: when in his old age he attempted to learn—practising the formation of letters in his bed during his free time on books and wax tablets he hid under his pillow—"his effort came too late in life and achieved little success", and his ability to read—which Einhard is silent about, and which no contemporary source supports—has also been called into question.

In 800, Charlemagne enlarged the hostel at the Muristan in Jerusalem and added a library to it. He certainly had not been personally in Jerusalem.

Church reforms

Charlemagne expanded the reform Church's programme unlike his father, Pippin, and uncle, Carloman. The deepening of the spiritual life was later to be seen as central to public policy and royal governance. His reform focused on strengthening the church's power structure, improving clergy's skill and moral quality, standardising liturgical practices, improvements on the basic tenets of the faith and the rooting out of paganism. His authority extended over church and state. He could discipline clerics, control ecclesiastical property and define orthodox doctrine. Despite the harsh legislation and sudden change, he had developed support from clergy who approved his desire to deepen the piety and morals of his subjects.

In 809–810, Charlemagne called a church council in Aachen, which confirmed the unanimous belief in the West that the Holy Spirit proceeds from the Father and the Son (ex Patre Filioque) and sanctioned inclusion in the Nicene Creed of the phrase Filioque (and the Son). For this Charlemagne sought the approval of Pope Leo III. The Pope, while affirming the doctrine and approving its use in teaching, opposed its inclusion in the text of the Creed as adopted in the 381 First Council of Constantinople. This spoke of the procession of the Holy Spirit from the Father, without adding phrases such as "and the Son", "through the Son", or "alone". Stressing his opposition, the Pope had the original text inscribed in Greek and Latin on two heavy shields that were displayed in Saint Peter's Basilica.

Writing reforms

During Charles' reign, the Roman half uncial script and its cursive version, which had given rise to various continental minuscule scripts, were combined with features from the insular scripts in use in Irish and English monasteries. Carolingian minuscule was created partly under the patronage of Charlemagne. Alcuin, who ran the palace school and scriptorium at Aachen, was probably a chief influence.

The revolutionary character of the Carolingian reform, however, can be overemphasised; efforts at taming Merovingian and Germanic influence had been underway before Alcuin arrived at Aachen. The new minuscule was disseminated first from Aachen and later from the influential scriptorium at Tours, where Alcuin retired as an abbot.

Political reforms
Charlemagne engaged in many reforms of Frankish governance while continuing many traditional practices, such as the division of the kingdom among sons.

Divisio regnorum
In 806, Charlemagne first made provision for the traditional division of the empire on his death. For Charles the Younger he designated Austrasia and Neustria, Saxony, Burgundy and Thuringia. To Pippin, he gave Italy, Bavaria, and Swabia. Louis received Aquitaine, the Spanish March and Provence. The imperial title was not mentioned, which led to the suggestion that, at that particular time, Charlemagne regarded the title as an honorary achievement that held no hereditary significance.

Pepin died in 810 and Charles in 811. Charlemagne then reconsidered the matter, and in 813, crowned his youngest son, Louis, co-emperor and co-King of the Franks, granting him a half-share of the empire and the rest upon Charlemagne's own death. The only part of the Empire that Louis was not promised was Italy, which Charlemagne specifically bestowed upon Pippin's illegitimate son Bernard.

Appearance

Manner

Einhard tells in his twenty-fourth chapter: Charlemagne threw grand banquets and feasts for special occasions such as religious holidays and four of his weddings. When he was not working, he loved Christian books, horseback riding, swimming, bathing in natural hot springs with his friends and family, and hunting. Franks were well known for horsemanship and hunting skills. Charles was a light sleeper and would stay in his bed chambers for entire days at a time due to restless nights. During these days, he would not get out of bed when a quarrel occurred in his kingdom, instead summoning all members of the situation into his bedroom to be given orders. Einhard tells again in the twenty-fourth chapter: "In summer after the midday meal, he would eat some fruit, drain a single cup, put off his clothes and shoes, just as he did for the night, and rest for two or three hours. He was in the habit of awaking and rising from bed four or five times during the night."

Language

Charlemagne probably spoke a Rhenish Franconian dialect.

He also spoke Latin and had at least some understanding of Greek, according to Einhard (Grecam vero melius intellegere quam pronuntiare poterat, "he could understand Greek better than he could speak it").

The largely fictional account of Charlemagne's Iberian campaigns by Pseudo-Turpin, written some three centuries after his death, gave rise to the legend that the king also spoke Arabic.

Physical appearance

Charlemagne's personal appearance is known from a good description by Einhard after his death in the biography Vita Karoli Magni. Einhard states:

The physical portrait provided by Einhard is confirmed by contemporary depictions such as coins and his  bronze statuette kept in the Louvre. In 1861, Charlemagne's tomb was opened by scientists who reconstructed his skeleton and estimated it to be measured . The width of the bone suggested he was gracile in body build.

Dress

Charlemagne wore the traditional costume of the Frankish people, described by Einhard thus:

He wore a blue cloak and always carried a sword typically of a golden or silver hilt. He wore intricately jeweled swords to banquets or ambassadorial receptions. Nevertheless:

On great feast days, he wore embroidery and jewels on his clothing and shoes. He had a golden buckle for his cloak on such occasions and would appear with his great diadem, but he despised such apparel according to Einhard, and usually dressed like the common people.

Homes 
Charlemagne had residences across his kingdom, including numerous private estates that were governed in accordance with the Capitulare de villis. A 9th-century document detailing the inventory of an estate at Asnapium listed amounts of livestock, plants and vegetables and kitchenware including cauldrons, drinking cups, brass kettles and firewood. The manor contained seventeen houses built inside the courtyard for nobles and family members and was separated from its supporting villas.

Beatification 
Charlemagne was revered as a saint in the Holy Roman Empire and some other locations after the twelfth century. The Apostolic See did not recognise his invalid canonisation by Antipope Paschal III, done to gain the favour of Frederick Barbarossa in 1165. The Apostolic See annulled all of Paschal's ordinances at the Third Lateran Council in 1179. He is not enumerated among the 28 saints named "Charles" in the Roman Martyrology. His beatification has been acknowledged as cultus confirmed and is celebrated on 28 January.

Cultural impact

Middle Ages 
The author of the Visio Karoli Magni written around 865 uses facts gathered apparently from Einhard and his own observations on the decline of Charlemagne's family after the dissensions war (840–43) as the basis for a visionary tale of Charles' meeting with a prophetic spectre in a dream.

Charlemagne was a model knight as one of the Nine Worthies who enjoyed an important legacy in European culture. One of the great medieval literary cycles, the Charlemagne cycle or the Matter of France, centres on his deeds—the Emperor with the Flowing Beard of Roland fame—and his historical commander of the border with Brittany, Roland, and the 12 paladins. These are analogous to, and inspired the myth of, the Knights of the Round Table of King Arthur's court. Their tales constitute the first chansons de geste.

In the 12th century, Geoffrey of Monmouth based his stories of Arthur largely on stories of Charlemagne. During the Hundred Years' War in the 14th century, there was considerable cultural conflict in England, where the Norman rulers were aware of their French roots and identified with Charlemagne, Anglo-Saxon natives felt more affinity for Arthur, whose own legends were relatively primitive. Therefore, storytellers in England adapted legends of Charlemagne and his 12 Peers to the Arthurian tales.

In the Divine Comedy, the spirit of Charlemagne appears to Dante in the Heaven of Mars, among the other "warriors of the faith".

19th century 

Charlemagne's capitularies were quoted by Pope Benedict XIV in his apostolic constitution 'Providas' against freemasonry: "For in no way are we able to understand how they can be faithful to us, who have shown themselves unfaithful to God and disobedient to their Priests".

Charlemagne appears in Adelchi, the second tragedy by Italian writer Alessandro Manzoni, first published in 1822.

In 1867, an equestrian statue of Charlemagne was made by Louis Jehotte and was inaugurated in 1868 on the Boulevard d'Avroy in Liège. In the niches of the neo-roman pedestal are six statues of Charlemagne's ancestors (Sainte Begge, Pépin de Herstal, Charles Martel, Bertrude, Pépin de Landen and Pépin le Bref).

The North Wall Frieze in the courtroom of the Supreme Court of the United States depicts Charlemagne as a legal reformer.

20th century 
The city of Aachen has, since 1949, awarded an international prize (called the Karlspreis der Stadt Aachen) in honour of Charlemagne. It is awarded annually to "personages of merit who have promoted the idea of Western unity by their political, economic and literary endeavours." Winners of the prize include Richard von Coudenhove-Kalergi, the founder of the pan-European movement, Alcide De Gasperi, and Winston Churchill.

In its national anthem, "El Gran Carlemany", the microstate of Andorra credits Charlemagne with its independence.

In 1964, young French singer France Gall released the hit song "Sacré Charlemagne" in which the lyrics blame the great king for imposing the burden of compulsory education on French children.

Charlemagne is quoted by Dr Henry Jones, Sr. in Indiana Jones and the Last Crusade. After using his umbrella to induce a flock of seagulls to smash through the glass cockpit of a pursuing German fighter plane, Henry Jones remarks, "I suddenly remembered my Charlemagne: 'Let my armies be the rocks and the trees and the birds in the sky. Despite the quote's popularity since the movie, there is no evidence that Charlemagne actually said this.

21st century
A 2010 episode of QI discussed the mathematics completed by Mark Humphrys that calculated that all modern Europeans are highly likely to share Charlemagne as a common ancestor (see most recent common ancestor).

The Economist featured a weekly column entitled "Charlemagne", focusing generally on European affairs and, more usually and specifically, on the European Union and its politics.

Actor and singer Christopher Lee's symphonic metal concept album Charlemagne: By the Sword and the Cross and its heavy metal follow-up Charlemagne: The Omens of Death feature the events of Charlemagne's life.

In April 2014, on the occasion of the 1200th anniversary of Charlemagne's death, public art Mein Karl by Ottmar Hörl at Katschhof place was installed between city hall and the Aachen cathedral, displaying 500 Charlemagne statues.

Charlemagne features as a playable character in the 2014 Charlemagne expansion for the grand strategy video game Crusader Kings 2.

Charlemagne is a playable character in the Mobile/PC Game Rise of Kingdoms.

In the 2018 video game Fate/Extella Link, Charlemagne appears as a Heroic Spirit separated into two Saint Graphs: the adventurous hero Charlemagne, who embodies the fantasy aspect as leader of the Twelve Paladins, and the villain Karl de Große, who embodies the historical aspect as Holy Roman Emperor.

In July 2022, Charlemagne featured as a character in an episode of The Family Histories Podcast, and it references his role as an ancestor of all modern Europeans. He is portrayed here in later life, and is speaking Latin, which is translated by a device. He is returned to 9th Century Aquitaine by the end of the episode after a DNA sample has been extracted.

Notes

References

Citations

Bibliography

 Charlemagne, from Encyclopædia Britannica, full-article, latest edition.
 
 
 
 
 
 
 
 
 
 
 
 
 
 
 
 
 
 
 
 
 
 
 
 
 
 
 
 
 
 
 
 
 
 
 
 
  Comprises the Annales regni Francorum and The History of the Sons of Louis the Pious

External links

 The Making of Charlemagne's Europe (freely available database of prosopographical and socio-economic data from legal documents dating to Charlemagne's reign, produced by King's College London)
 
 
 The Sword of Charlemagne (myArmoury.com article)
 
 Charter given by Charlemagne for St. Emmeram's Abbey showing the Emperor's seal, 22.2.794 . Taken from the collections of the Lichtbildarchiv älterer Originalurkunden at Marburg University
 
 
 An interactive map of Charlemagne's travels
 
 

 
740s births
814 deaths
9th-century Holy Roman Emperors
8th-century Lombard monarchs
9th-century kings of Italy
8th-century dukes of Bavaria
9th-century dukes of Bavaria
Christian royal saints
Deaths from respiratory disease
Founding monarchs
Frankish warriors
French Christians
German Christians
Captains General of the Church
Bibliophiles
Characters in The Song of Roland
Characters in Orlando Innamorato and Orlando Furioso
History of the Low Countries
8th-century Frankish kings
Carolingian dynasty
Matter of France
Chansons de geste
Medieval Roman consuls
Beatifications by Pope Benedict XIV